Leonardo Martín Sánchez Cohener (born 27 May 2000) is a Paraguayan footballer who currently plays as a forward for Club Sportivo San Lorenzo on loan from Club Olimpia.

International career
Sánchez Cohener represented Paraguay at the 2017 FIFA U-17 World Cup, scoring in a 3-2 victory against the Mali.

Career statistics

Club

Notes

References

2000 births
Living people
Paraguayan footballers
Paraguayan expatriate footballers
Association football forwards
Club Olimpia footballers
C.D. Huachipato footballers
Club Sportivo San Lorenzo footballers
Paraguayan Primera División players
Chilean Primera División players
Expatriate footballers in Chile
Paraguayan expatriate sportspeople in Chile